The University of Arizona (Arizona, U of A, UArizona, or UA) is a public land-grant research university in Tucson, Arizona. Founded in 1885 by the 13th Arizona Territorial Legislature, it was the first university in the Arizona Territory.

The university is part of the prestigious Association of American Universities (AAU), which represents the 65 leading public and private research universities in North America. It consistently ranks in the top 40 universities nationwide in research spending over the last decade according to the National Science Foundation. The university is classified among "R1: Doctoral Universities – Very High Research Activity". The University of Arizona is one of three universities governed by the Arizona Board of Regents. , the university enrolled 49,471 students in 19 separate colleges/schools, including the University of Arizona College of Medicine in Tucson and Phoenix and the James E. Rogers College of Law, and is affiliated with two academic medical centers (Banner – University Medical Center Tucson and Banner – University Medical Center Phoenix). In 2021, University of Arizona acquired Ashford University, a former for-profit college with more than 30,000 students and rebranded it as The University of Arizona Global Campus.

Known as the Arizona Wildcats (often shortened to "Cats"), the UA's intercollegiate athletic teams are members of the Pac-12 Conference of the NCAA. UA athletes have won national titles in several sports, most notably men's basketball, baseball, and softball. The official colors of the university and its athletic teams are cardinal red and navy blue.

History

After the passage of the Morrill Land-Grant Act of 1862, the push for a university in Arizona grew. The Arizona Territory's "Thieving Thirteenth" Legislature approved the University of Arizona in 1885 and selected the city of Tucson to receive the appropriation to build the university. Tucson hoped to receive the appropriation for the territory's mental hospital, which carried a $100,000 allocation instead of the $25,000 allotted to the territory's only university (Arizona State University was also chartered in 1885, but it was created as Arizona's normal school, and not a university). Flooding on the Salt River delayed Tucson's legislators, and by they time they reached Prescott, back-room deals allocating the most desirable territorial institutions had been made. Tucson was largely disappointed with receiving what was viewed as an inferior prize.

With no parties willing to provide land for the new institution, the citizens of Tucson prepared to return the money to the Territorial Legislature until two gamblers and a saloon keeper decided to donate 40 acres to the Board of Regents. Construction of Old Main, the first building on campus, began on October 27, 1887, and classes met for the first time in 1891 with 32 students in Old Main, which is still in use today. Because there were no high schools in Arizona Territory, the university maintained separate preparatory classes for the first 23 years of operation.

In 1924, during Cloyd Marvin's tenure as president, the university was recognized by the Association of American Universities.

Modern times
On April 17, 2020, the University of Arizona announced temporary pay cuts and furloughs to its 15,000 employees as its Tucson campus shut down due to the COVID-19 pandemic. All employees making up to $150,000 per year were furloughed, with the length determined by each employees' salary. For employees making more than $150,000 per year, pay cuts of 17% or 20% were instituted. Also in 2020, the University of Arizona announced it had purchased Ashford University from Zovio and renamed it The University of Arizona Global Campus.

Academics
The University of Arizona offers bachelor's, master's, doctoral, and professional degrees. Grades are given on a strict 4-point scale with "A" worth 4, "B" worth 3, "C" worth 2, "D" worth 1 and "E" worth zero points.

Rankings

The Center for World University Rankings in 2017 ranked Arizona No. 52 in the world and 34 in the U.S. The 2018 Times Higher Education World University Rankings rated University of Arizona 161st in the world and the 2017/18 QS World University Rankings ranked it 230th.

In 2015, Design Intelligence ranked the College of Architecture and Landscape Architecture's (CALA) undergraduate program in architecture 10th in the nation for all universities, public and private. The same publication ranked UA ranked 20th in overall undergraduate architecture programs.

Admissions

The UA is considered a "selective" university by U.S. News & World Report. In the 2014–2015 academic year, 68 freshman students were National Merit Scholars.

UA students hail from all states in the U.S. While nearly 69% of students are from Arizona, nearly 11% are from California, and 8% are international, followed by a significant student presence from Texas, Illinois, Washington, Colorado and New York (fall 2013).

Tuition
Tuition for both fall and spring semesters at the University of Arizona is $12,700 for full-time undergraduate residents and $37,200 for non-residents. As in other states, the cost of tuition has been rising due to the reduction in government support and large increase in administrative staff over teaching staff. Undergraduate students who enrolled in the UA's optional tuition guarantee program in 2014 will remain at $11,591 for residents and $30,745 for non-residents through the 2018–19 academic year. Incoming students enrolled in a bachelor's degree program are automatically eligible for the Guaranteed Tuition Program and will not be subject to tuition increases for 8 continuous semesters (four years). The Guaranteed Tuition Program does not apply to rates for summer and winter sessions.

Honors College
The University of Arizona W.A. Franke Honors College provides a program for over 4,500 students that creates a smaller community feel like that of a liberal arts college within a large research institution. It started in 1962 with an acceptance of seventy-five students and has grown to 5,508 in the academic year 2016–2017. The main offices for the University of Arizona Honors College are at N Fremont Ave and E Mabel St, inside the newly constructed Honors Village. It was renamed from the Honors College to the W.A. Franke Honors College in recognition of a $25 million gift commitment made by William A. "Bill" Franke, his wife, Carolyn, and the Franke family.

Research
Arizona is classified among "R1: Doctoral Universities – Very high research activity". The university's research expenditure in fiscal year 2018 was $687.1 million. Arizona is the fourth most awarded public university by NASA for research. The UA was awarded over $325 million for its Lunar and Planetary Laboratory (LPL) to lead NASA's 2007–08 mission to Mars to explore the Martian Arctic, and $800 million for its OSIRIS-REx mission, the first in U.S. history to sample an asteroid. The LPL's work in the Cassini spacecraft orbit around Saturn is larger than any other university globally. The U of A laboratory designed and operated the atmospheric radiation investigations and imaging on the probe. The UA operates the HiRISE camera, a part of the Mars Reconnaissance Orbiter. While using the HiRISE camera in 2011, UA alumnus Lujendra Ojha and his team discovered proof of liquid water on the surface of Mars—a discovery confirmed by NASA in 2015. UA receives more NASA grants annually than the next nine top NASA-Jet Propulsion Laboratory-funded universities combined. , the UA's Lunar and Planetary Laboratory is actively involved in ten spacecraft missions: Cassini VIMS; Grail; the HiRISE camera orbiting Mars; the Juno mission orbiting Jupiter; Lunar Reconnaissance Orbiter (LRO); Maven, which will explore Mars' upper atmosphere and interactions with the Sun; Solar Probe Plus, a historic mission into the Sun's atmosphere for the first time; Rosetta's VIRTIS; WISE; and OSIRIS-REx, the first U.S. sample-return mission to a near-Earth asteroid, which launched on September 8, 2016.

UA students have been selected as Truman, Rhodes, Goldwater, and Fulbright Scholars. According to The Chronicle of Higher Education, UA is among the top 25 producers of Fulbright awards in the U.S.

UA is a member of the Association of Universities for Research in Astronomy, a consortium of institutions pursuing research in astronomy. The association operates observatories and telescopes, notably Kitt Peak National Observatory just outside Tucson. UA is a member of the Association of American Universities, and the sole representative from Arizona to this group. Led by Roger Angel, researchers in the Steward Observatory Mirror Lab at UA are working in concert to build the world's most advanced telescope. Known as the Giant Magellan Telescope, it will produce images 10 times sharper than those from the Earth-orbiting Hubble Space Telescope. The telescope is set to be completed in 2021. GMT will ultimately cost $1 billion. Researchers from at least nine institutions are working to secure the funding for the project. The telescope will include seven 18-ton mirrors capable of providing clear images of volcanoes and riverbeds on Mars and mountains on the Moon at a rate 40 times faster than the world's current large telescopes. The mirrors of the Giant Magellan Telescope will be built at the U of A and transported to a permanent mountaintop site in the Chilean Andes where the telescope will be constructed.

Reaching Mars in March 2006, the Mars Reconnaissance Orbiter contained the HiRISE camera, with Principal Investigator Alfred McEwen as the lead on the project. This NASA mission to Mars carrying the UA-designed camera is capturing the highest-resolution images of the planet ever seen. The journey of the orbiter was 300 million miles. In August 2007, the UA, under the charge of Peter Smith, led the Phoenix Mars Mission, the first mission completely controlled by a university. Reaching the planet's surface in May 2008, the mission's purpose was to improve knowledge of the Martian Arctic. The Arizona Radio Observatory, a part of Steward Observatory, operates the Submillimeter Telescope on Mount Graham.

The National Science Foundation funded the iPlant Collaborative in 2008 with a $50 million grant. In 2013, iPlant Collaborative received a $50 million renewal grant. Rebranded in late 2015 as "CyVerse", the collaborative cloud-based data management platform is moving beyond life sciences to provide cloud-computing access across all scientific disciplines.

In June 2011, the university announced it would assume full ownership of the Biosphere 2 scientific research facility in Oracle, Arizona. Biosphere 2 was constructed by private developers (funded mainly by Texas businessman and philanthropist Ed Bass) with its first closed system experiment commencing in 1991. The university had been the official management partner of the facility for research purposes since 2007.

In 2018 UA received funding from the Pioneer Fund, a non-profit institute which promotes scientific racism and eugenics. The funds were applied for by Aurelio Jose Figueredo, who directs the graduate program on human behavior and evolutionary psychology. Funds from the grant were used by Figueredo to attend the 2016 London Conference on Intelligence, where presentations on eugenics are given. Figueredo has also reviewed papers for Mankind Quarterly, a journal which has advocated for racial hierarchy. Figueredo has disavowed eugenics and racial inferiority.

Publications
Since 1945 the university has published Arizona Quarterly, an academic literary journal.

Global teaching and research 
Arizona partnership with Universidad de Sonora was renewed in August 2017, focusing on a partnership in geology and physics.

Arizona has been part of both theoretical and experimental research in particle and nuclear physics in the framework of the CERN program since 1987. The collaboration was initiated by the theoretician Peter A. Carruthers, head of the physics department, and Johann Rafelski who initiated the quark-gluon-plasma program at CERN. Arizona officially joined the CERN-LHC ATLAS Collaboration in 1994.

Arizona has a strategic program to attract foreign scholars, in particular from China.

Libraries

According to the 2015-2016 Association of Research Libraries' "Spending by University Research Libraries" report, UA libraries are ranked as the 37th overall university library in North America (out of 114) for university investment.

, the UA's library system contains over six million print volumes, 1.1 million electronic books, and 74,000 electronic journals. The Main Library, opened in 1976, serves as the library system's reference, periodical, and administrative center; most of the main collections are housed here. The Main Library is on the southeast quadrant of campus near McKale Center and Arizona Stadium.

In 2002, the Integrated Learning Center (ILC) was completed as a $20 million,  computer facility intended for use by incoming students. The ILC features classrooms, auditoriums, a courtyard with vending machines, and an expanded computer lab with several dozen workstations and 3D printing. Computers and 3D printing are available for use by the general public (with some restrictions) as well as by UA students, faculty and staff. Much of the ILC was constructed underground, underneath the east end of the Mall. The ILC connects to the basement floor of the Main Library. As part of the project, additional new office space for the library was constructed on the existing fifth floor.

The Special Collections Library is adjacent to the Main Library. It was established in 1958, and it houses materials primarily concerned with Arizona and Southwestern history, borderlands studies, and literature.

The Weaver Science and Engineering Library is in a nearby building from the 1960s that houses volumes and periodicals from those fields. The Music Building (on the northwest quadrant of campus where many of the fine arts disciplines are clustered) houses the Fine Arts Library, including reference collections for architecture, music (including sheet music, recordings and listening stations), and photography. There is a small library at the Center for Creative Photography, also in the fine arts complex, devoted to the art and science of photography. The Law Library is in the law building (James E. Rogers College of Law) at the intersection of Speedway Boulevard and Mountain Avenue.

The Arizona Health Sciences Library, built in 1996, is on the Health Sciences Center on the north end of campus and in Phoenix on the Phoenix Biomedical Campus, in the Health Sciences Education Building (HSEB). The library serves the Colleges of Medicine, Nursing, Pharmacy, Public Health, and Veterinary Medicine, the University of Arizona Health Network, and is a resource for health professionals and citizens across the state.

Campus

Roy Place, a prominent Tucson architect, designed many of the early buildings, including the Arizona State Museum buildings (one of them the 1927 main library) and Centennial Hall. Place's use of red brick set the tone for the red brick facades that are a basic part of nearly all UA buildings: almost every UA building has red brick as a major component of the design, or at the very least, a stylistic accent to harmonize it with the other campus buildings. In the early 1930s, Place updated the campus master plan, conceived by his architectural partner John Lyman in 1919 and modeled after the University of Virginia.

The campus is roughly divided into quadrants. The north and south sides of campus are delineated by a grassy expanse called the Mall, which stretches from Old Main eastward to the campus' eastern border at Campbell Avenue (a major north–south arterial street). The west and east sides of campus are separated roughly by Highland Avenue and the Student Union Memorial Center (see below).

The science and mathematics buildings tend to be clustered in the southwest quadrant; the intercollegiate athletics facilities to the southeast; the arts and humanities buildings to the northwest (with the dance department being a major exception as its main facilities are far to the east end of campus), with the engineering buildings in the north central area. The optical and space sciences buildings are clustered on the east side of campus near the sports stadiums and the (1976) main library.

Speedway Boulevard, one of Tucson's primary east–west arterial streets, traditionally defined the northern boundary of campus but since the 1980s, several university buildings have been constructed directly on, and north of, this street, expanding into a neighborhood traditionally filled with apartment complexes and single-family homes. The university has purchased a handful of these apartment complexes for student housing in recent years. Sixth Street typically defines the southern boundary, with single-family homes (many of which are rented out to students) south of this street.

Park Avenue has traditionally defined the western boundary of campus, and there is a stone wall which runs along a large portion of the east side of the street, leading to the old Main Gate, and into the driveway leading to Old Main. Along or adjacent to all of these major streets are a wide variety of retail facilities serving the student, faculty and staff population (as is the case in other similar university neighborhoods throughout the United States): shops, bookstores, bars, banks, credit unions, coffeehouses and major chain fast-food restaurants such as Chipotle, Panera Bread and Pei Wei. The area near University Boulevard and Park Avenue, near the Main Gate, has been a major center of such retail activity going back to the university's early decades; many shops dating from the 1920s have been renovated since the late 1990s, other new retail shops have been built in recent years, and a nine-story Marriott hotel was built in this immediate district in 1996.

The Stevie Eller Dance Theater, opened in 2003 (across the Mall from McKale Center) as a  dedicated performance venue for the UA's dance program, one of the most highly regarded university dance departments in the United States. Designed by Gould Evans, a Phoenix-based architectural firm, the theater was awarded the 2003 Citation Award from the American Institute of Architects, Arizona Chapter.

The Computer Science department's webcam provides a live feed of the campus as seen from the top of the Gould-Simpson building (the tallest classroom building on campus at 10 stories). The Berger Memorial Fountain at the west entrance of Old Main honors the UA students who died in World War I, and dates back to 1919. The University of Arizona generates renewable energy with solar panels (photo voltaic) that have been installed on campus buildings. In 2011, the Sustainable Endowments Institute gave the university a College Sustainability Report Card grade of "B." In 2015, the university opened the ENR2, housing the University of Arizona School of Geography, Development and Environment set to be one of its "greenest" buildings on campus with features like a cutting edge air conditioning system and 55,000-gallon water-harvesting tank. Designed to resemble a slot canyon in the Sonoran Desert, the 150,000 sq. ft. building focuses on adaptation and reducing our carbon footprint.

The oldest campus buildings are west of Old Main. Most of the buildings east of Old Main date from the 1940s to the 1980s (a period of tremendous growth on campus and in Tucson in general), with a few recent buildings constructed in the years since 1990.

The Student Union Memorial Center
 
The Student Union Memorial Center, on the north side of the Mall east of Old Main, was completely reconstructed between 2000 and 2003. It replaced a  structure originally opened in 1951 with additions during the 1960s and early 1970s. The student union has  of space on four levels, and includes 14 restaurants, a grocery market, a two-level bookstore with an office supplies section, 23 meeting rooms, eight lounge areas (including one dedicated to the USS Arizona), a computer lab, a U.S. Post Office, and a copy center.

The building was designed to mirror the USS Arizona (BB-39). A variety of sculptures pepper the premises, decorating the air with the chimes of dog tags or the colors of refracted light in honor of those who have served. A bell housed on the USS Arizona, one of the two bells rescued from the ship after the attack on Pearl Harbor, has a permanent home in the clock tower of the Student Union Memorial Center. The bell arrived on campus in July 1946. The bell was rung seven times on the third Wednesday of every month at 12:07 pm – symbolic of the battleship's sinking on December 7, 1941 – to honor individuals at the UA, as well as after home football victories, over any team except other Arizona schools. In December 2020, it was announced that at the request of the U.S. Navy, who still officially owns the bell, and in the interest of preservation of the historic artifact, that the bell would no longer be rung.

The Arboretum at The University of Arizona
Much of the main campus has been designated an arboretum. Plants from around the world are labeled along a self-guided plant walk. The Krutch Cactus Garden  includes the tallest Boojum tree in the state of Arizona.  Two herbaria on the university campus are referred to as "ARIZ" in the Index Herbariorum

The campus also boasts hundreds of olive trees many of which were planted by Prof. Robert H. Forbes. Many of these trees are over a hundred years old.

Organization

The University of Arizona, like its sister institutions Arizona State University and Northern Arizona University, is governed by the Arizona Board of Regents or the ABOR, a 12-member body. Eight volunteer members are appointed by the Governor to staggered eight-year terms; two students serve on the board for two-year appointments, with the first year being a nonvoting apprentice year. The Governor and the Superintendent of Public Instruction serve as voting ex-officio members. The ABOR provides "policy guidance" and oversight to the three major degree-granting universities, as provided for by Title 15 of the Arizona Revised Statutes.

Robert C. Robbins, M.D., was named the 22nd president of the UA on March 7, 2017. He began his term on June 1, 2017. Previously, he was the president and CEO of Texas Medical Center in Houston from 2012 to 2017. In prior roles, Robbins was professor and chairman of the Department of Cardiothoracic Surgery at Stanford University School of Medicine, founding director of the Stanford Cardiovascular Institute, president of the International Society of Heart and Lung Transplantation and president of the Western Thoracic Surgical Association.

Robbins replaced Ann Weaver Hart, M.A., Ph.D., who was the university's first female president. He was named the lone finalist to succeed as UA president after Hart announced she would not seek to extend to her contract past its June 30, 2018 end date. During her tenure, Hart led the university's first integrated strategic academic and business plan and agreement with Banner Health to support the UA's biosciences research and medical education initiatives.

Notable past presidents of the university include: Hart (formerly president of Temple University); interim president Eugene Sander, who retired from the university after 25 years of service as an educator and administrator, including nearly one year in the interim president role; Robert N. Shelton, who began his tenure in 2006 and resigned in the summer of 2011 to accept the presidency of the Fiesta Bowl, (a BCS college football tournament played annually in the Phoenix area). Shelton's predecessor, Peter Likins, vacated his post at the conclusion of the 2005–06 academic term. Other past UA presidents include Manuel Pacheco (Likins' primary predecessor; the first person of Hispanic descent to lead the university and for whom the Integrated Learning Center is named), Henry Koffler (Pacheco's predecessor and the first UA alumnus to lead the university), John Schaefer, Richard Harvill (who presided over a period of dramatic growth for the UA in the 1950s and 1960s), Homer L. Shantz, Kendric C. Babcock, and Rufus B. von KleinSmid.

Athletics

Like many large public universities in the U.S., sports are a major activity on campus, and receive a large operating budget. Arizona's athletic teams are nicknamed the Wildcats, a name derived from a 1914 football game with then California champions Occidental College, where the L.A. Times asserted, "the Arizona men showed the fight of wildcats." The University of Arizona participates in the NCAA's Division I-A in the Pac-12 Conference, which it was admitted in 1978.

Teams

Men's basketball

The men's basketball team has been one of the nation's most successful programs since Lute Olson was hired as head coach in 1983, and is still known as a national powerhouse in Division I men's basketball. Between 1985 and 2009, the team reached the NCAA Tournament 25 consecutive years, which is the third-longest streak in NCAA history, after Kansas, with appearances from 1990–present, North Carolina, with 27 consecutive appearances from 1975 to 2001. The Wildcats have reached the Final Four of the NCAA tournament in 1988, 1994, 1997, and 2001. In 1997, Arizona defeated the University of Kentucky, the then-defending national champions, to win the NCAA National Championship (NCAA Men's Division I Basketball Championship) by a score of 84–79 overtime; Arizona's first national championship victory. The 1997 championship team became the first and only in NCAA history to defeat three number-one seeds en route to a national title (Kansas, North Carolina, and Kentucky—the North Carolina game being the final game for longtime UNC head coach Dean Smith). Point guard Miles Simon was chosen as 1997 Final Four MVP (Simon was also an assistant coach under Olson from 2005 to 2008). The Cats also boast the third-highest winning percentage in the nation over the last twenty years. Arizona has won a total of 28 regular season conference championships in its program's history, and 6 PAC-12 tournaments. Since 2005, Arizona has produced 17 NBA draft picks.

The Wildcats play their home games at the McKale Center in Tucson. A number of former Wildcats have gone on to pursue successful professional NBA careers (especially during the Lute Olson era), including Gilbert Arenas, Richard Jefferson, Mike Bibby, Jason Terry, Sean Elliott, Damon Stoudamire, Khalid Reeves, Luke Walton, Hassan Adams, Salim Stoudamire, Andre Iguodala, Channing Frye, Brian Williams (later known as Bison Dele), Sean Rooks, Jud Buechler, Michael Dickerson, Chase Budinger, Jordan Hill, Jerryd Bayless, Derrick Williams, Kadeem Allen, Aaron Gordon, Solomon Hill, Rondae Hollis-Jefferson, Stanley Johnson, T.J McConnell, Lauri Elias Markkanen, Kobi Simmons, Steve Kerr, Deandre Ayton, Rawle Alkins, and Allonzo Trier. Kenny Lofton, now best known as a former Major League Baseball star, was a four-year letter winner as a Wildcat basketball player (and was on the 1988 Final Four team), before one year on the Arizona baseball team. Another notable former Wildcat basketball player is Eugene Edgerson, who played on the 1997 and 2001 Final Four squads, and spent some of his professional careers as one of the Harlem Globetrotters as "Wildkat" Edgerson.

Before Lute Olson's hire in 1983, Arizona was the first major Division I school to hire an African American head coach in Fred Snowden, in 1972. After a 25-year tenure as Arizona head coach, Olson announced his retirement from the Arizona basketball program in October 2008. After two seasons of using interim coaches, Arizona named Sean Miller, head coach at Xavier University, as its new head basketball coach in April 2009. During his tenure, Miller led the Wildcats to five regular-season conference championships, three conference tournament championships, and seven appearances in the NCAA tournament. Miller served as head coach for four of the seven seasons in Arizona history in which the Wildcats have won 30 or more games.

In the aftermath of the basketball program receiving five Level I violations from the NCAA in March 2021 (the culmination of a major NCAA investigation going back to 2017), Miller was relieved of his duties in April 2021 after twelve seasons. After a national search and much media speculation, Arizona announced soon afterward that Gonzaga assistant Tommy Lloyd would become the 18th head coach of Arizona men's basketball.

Football

The football team began at The University of Arizona in 1899 under the nickname "Varsity" (a name kept until the 1914 season when the team was deemed the "Wildcats").

The football team was notably successful in the 1990s, under head coach Dick Tomey; his "Desert Swarm" defense was characterized by tough, hard-nosed tactics. In 1993, the team had its first 10-win season and beat the University of Miami Hurricanes in the Fiesta Bowl by a score of 29–0. It was the bowl game's only shutout in its then 23-year history. In 1998, the team posted a school-record 12–1 season and made the Holiday Bowl in which it defeated the Nebraska Cornhuskers. Arizona ended the season ranked 4th nationally in the coaches and API poll. The 1998 Holiday Bowl was televised on ESPN and set the now-surpassed record of being the most-watched bowl game in the network's history. From November 2003 until October 2011, the program was led by Mike Stoops, brother of Bob Stoops, the head football coach at the University of Oklahoma (the 2000 BCS national champions); Stoops was fired on October 10, 2011. Former Michigan and West Virginia head coach Rich Rodriguez was hired on November 21, 2011, to lead the Wildcats. The announcement was made by UA athletic director Greg Byrne via Twitter. In his first season, Rodriguez took the Wildcats to the 2012 New Mexico Bowl, where they defeated the University of Nevada Wolf Pack. In his third season, the Wildcats won the Pac-12 South and played in the 2014 Fiesta Bowl. In 2015, the Wildcats played in their fourth consecutive bowl game, defeating the University of New Mexico in the New Mexico Bowl. In 2017, they lost to the Purdue Boilermakers in the Foster Farms Bowl, the Wildcats 21st bowl game.

Dave Heeke was named Arizona's 13th Director of Athletics in February 2017 and officially started in that role on April 1, 2017. Heeke served as Athletics Director at Central Michigan University for 11 years and as a staff member in the University of Oregon athletics department for 18 years. (Greg Byrne resigned from the post in January to accept the same role at the University of Alabama.)

Rodriguez was relieved of his duties on January 2, 2018, in the wake of an internal university investigation of sexual harassment claims made by Rodriguez's former administrative assistant. After a nationwide search and much media speculation, Kevin Sumlin was hired on January 14, 2018, as the new Wildcats head football coach. Sumlin was head coach at Texas A&M University and the University of Houston. After a disappointing three-season tenure, with the Wildcats posting a 5–7 (4–5 in Pac-12) record in 2018 and a 4–8 record (2–7 in Pac-12) record in 2019, Sumlin was fired at the conclusion of the 2020 season (a truncated schedule due to the COVID-19 pandemic).

After a nationwide search and much media speculation, former college and NFL coach Jedd Fisch (most recently the QB coach for the New England Patriots and a previous assistant at UCLA, Michigan, Miami and Minnesota) was chosen as the Wildcats’ 32nd head football coach, as announced in December 2020.

Baseball

The baseball team had its first season in 1904. The baseball team has captured four national championship titles in 1976, 1980, 1986 and 2012, with the first three coached by Jerry Kindall and the most recent by Andy Lopez. Arizona baseball teams have appeared in the NCAA National Championship title series a total of 34 times, including 1956, 1959, 1963, 1976, 1980, 1986, 2004, 2012, and 2016. Arizona baseball has appeared in the College World Series 18 times. Arizona is 7th all-time in games won in the regular season with 2,347 wins. Home games are played at Hi Corbett Field.

Jay Johnson, previously head coach of the University of Nevada baseball program, succeeded Andy Lopez who retired after the 2015 season. In his first season as head coach, Johnson guided his team to the programs 17th College World Series appearance and 8th championship series appearance.

Johnson resigned from the Wildcat program in June 2021 to accept the head coaching job at LSU. This was after leading the Wildcats to a Pac-12 conference championship and the 18th College World Series appearance in program history; they were eliminated in Omaha by Stanford.

In July 2021, Chip Hale was named the new head coach of Arizona baseball. Hale played for the Wildcats under Jerry Kindall and was on the 1986 College World Series championship team; he went on to play, coach and manage in the major leagues for several years, serving as manager of the Arizona Diamondbacks in 2015 and 2016, and most recently serving as the third base coach of the Detroit Tigers.

Arizona baseball also has a student section named The Hot Corner. Seventy-five former Arizona baseball players have played in the Major Leagues. Famous alums include Terry Francona, Kenny Lofton, Shelley Duncan, Trevor Hoffman, Mark Melancon, Chip Hale, Craig Lefferts, J. T. Snow, Don Lee, Carl Thomas, Jack Howell, Mike Paul, Dan Schneider, Rich Hinton, Ed Vosberg, Hank Leiber, Ron Hassey, Brad Mills, Joe Magrane, Alex Mejia, Dave Baldwin, Brian Anderson, Jack Daugherty, Scott Erickson, Gil Heredia, Casey Candaele, George Arias, and Scott Kingery.

Soccer
The University of Arizona women's soccer team wrapped up their 2017 season on Nov. 17 in the second round of the NCAA Tournament, finishing with an 11-5-4 record, and seven Pac-12 wins, the most in program history.

Led by coach Tony Amato, Arizona's seniors became the first group in program history to make three NCAA Tournament appearances, winning at least one match in each Tournament. The program had only two appearances in its history prior to the last four years. Ten members received PAC-12 academic honors for their performance in the classroom.

Softball

The Arizona softball team is among the top programs in the country. The softball team has won eight NCAA Women's College World Series titles, in 1991, 1993, 1994, 1996, 1997, 2001, 2006 and 2007 under head coach Mike Candrea (NCAA Softball Championship). The team has appeared in the NCAA National Championship in 1991, 1992, 1993, 1994, 1995, 1996, 1997 1998, 2001, 2002, 2006, 2007 and 2010 (a feat second only to UCLA), and has reached the College World Series 19 times. The Arizona Wildcats softball team won their first Pac-12 Championship in ten years after defeating the No. 12 UCLA Bruins 7–2, and qualified for its 31st consecutive NCAA tournament, creating a new NCAA softball record. Coach Candrea, along with former Arizona pitcher Jennie Finch, led the 2004 U.S. Olympic softball team to a gold medal in Athens, Greece. The Wildcat softball team plays at Rita Hillenbrand Memorial Stadium.

Golf
The university's golf teams have also been notably successful. The men's team won a national championship in 1992 (NCAA Division I Men's Golf Championships), and has produced a number of successful professionals, most notably Jim Furyk. The women's team won national championships in 1996, 2000 and 2018 (NCAA Women's Golf Championship). The women's golf program has produced professionals Annika Sörenstam, Lorena Ochoa, and Erica Blasberg.

Men's lacrosse
The lacrosse club team was founded in the mid-1960s. In the 1960s, Arizona was a Division I varsity program, coached by Carl Runk, an Arizona graduate and football player. In 1998, Runk retired after twenty-eight years at Towson University in Maryland.

Other
Many other Wildcats have met with success at the university. Alix Creek and Michelle Oldham won the NCAA Women's Doubles Tennis title in 1993, defeating Texas in the Final. Although surprising to some, the University of Arizona has a noteworthy history in ice hockey. The school's club hockey team, formerly known as the Icecats, won over 800 games between its inception in 1979 and 2011. The Icecats defeated Penn State for the National Collegiate Club Hockey National Championship in 1985. They also appeared in eight Final Fours (’84, ’86, ’87, ’88, ’91, ’93, ’94, ’97) and ten Elite Eights. , they are part of ACHA Division I, and are known formally as the Arizona Wildcats hockey team. Robert M. Tanita was a nationally ranked collegiate wrestler who reached the NCAA finals tournament as WAC champion in 1963.

Three national championships for synchronized swimming were won in 1980, 1981, and 1984, though these championships were in the Association of Intercollegiate Athletics for Women, and not the NCAA. Along with winning three national championships in the pool for synchronized swimming, the Wildcats have also won their first NCAA Championship in men and women's swimming and diving for the seasons of 2007–2008. Topping off these weekends Frank Busch, the men and women's head coach, was named NCAA Swimming Coach of the Year. Arizona men became the first team to claim a first-time title since UCLA's win in 1982. Also, the men ended Texas and Auburn's winning streak since 1998. At the end of the meet, the Texas Longhorns took second while 2007's champion, the Auburn Tigers, took fifth. For the women, Arizona worked on the disappointment of 2007's defeat. The women were winning until the last day when Auburn grasped the title. Unlike 2007, Arizona's women did not let anyone come close. The Wildcats won with 484 team points while the Auburn Tigers came in second with 348 and the Stanford Cardinal in third with 343. Student-athletes from the women's swimming and diving team have been particularly heralded by the NCAA. The NCAA Woman of the Year Award was won by UA swimmers Whitney Myers, Lacey Nymeyer and Justine Schluntz in 2007, 2009 and 2010 respectively. The three awards and the 1994 award won by track and field athlete Tanya Hughes are the highest number of Woman of the Year awards won by a single university.

Individual national championships
A number of notable individuals have also won national championships in the NCAA. Arizona's first NCAA Individual Champion in the sport of Men's Swimming came in 1981 when Doug Towne won the 500-yard freestyle at the NCAA championships. Another individual champion occurred in 1989 when Mariusz Podkoscielny won the 1650-yard (mile) at the NCAA National Championships held at the IUPUI Natatorium. Some other champion swimmers include Crissy Ahmann-Leighton, Ryk Neethling, Margo Geer, Kevin Cordes, and Amanda Beard. Annika Sörenstam won in 1991 in golf, and Brigetta Barrett won the women's high jump in 2013. The men's cross country has also produced two individual national titles in 1986 (Aaron Ramirez) and 1994 (Martin Keino) (NCAA Men's Cross Country Champions). The women's cross country also produced two individual national titles in 1996 (Amy Skieresz) and 2001 (Tara Chaplin) (NCAA Women's Cross Country Championship). Another notable individual was football standout Vance Johnson who won the NCAA long jump in 1982.

Rivalries
A strong athletic rivalry exists between the University of Arizona and Arizona State University in Tempe, Arizona. The University of Arizona leads the all-time record against Arizona State University in men's basketball (149–83), as well as in football (49–42–1). The football rivalry game between the schools is known as "The Duel in the Desert." The trophy awarded after each game is the Territorial Cup. Rivalries have also been created with other Pac-12 teams, especially University of California, Los Angeles which has provided a worthy softball rival and was Arizona's main basketball rival in the early and mid-1990s.

Mascot

The university's mascots are a pair of anthropomorphized wildcats named Wilbur and Wilma. The identities of Wilbur and Wilma are kept secret through the year as the mascots appear only in costume. In 1986, Wilbur married his longtime wildcat girlfriend, Wilma. Together, Wilbur and Wilma appear along with the cheerleading squad at most Wildcat sporting events. Arizona's first mascot was a real desert bobcat named "Rufus Arizona", introduced in 1915.

Wilbur was originally created by Bob White as a cartoon character in the university's humor magazine, Kitty Kat. From 1915 through the 1950s the school mascot was a live bobcat, a species known locally as a wildcat. This succession of live mascots were known by the common name of Rufus Arizona, originally named after Rufus von Kleinsmid, president of the university from 1914 to 1921. 1959 marked the creation of the first incarnated Wilbur, when University student John Paquette and his roommate, Dick Heller, came up with idea of creating a costume for a student to wear. Ed Stuckenhoff was chosen to wear the costume at the homecoming game in 1959 against Texas Tech and since then it has become a long-standing tradition. Wilbur celebrated his 50th birthday in November 2009.

Fight song
In 1952 Jack K. Lee, an applicant for the UA's band directorship, departed Tucson by air following an interview with UA administration. From his airplane window, Lee observed the huge letters on the roof of the UA gymnasium reading "BEAR DOWN." Inspired, Lee scribbled down the music and lyrics to an up-tempo song. By the time his plane landed, he had virtually finished it. A few weeks later Lee was named the UA band director, and in September 1952, the UA band performed "Bear Down, Arizona!" in public for the first time. Soon thereafter, "Bear Down, Arizona!" became accepted as UA's fight song (Bear Down).

ZonaZoo
Officially implemented in 2003, ZonaZoo is the official student section and student ticketing program for the University of Arizona Athletics. The ZonaZoo program is co-owned by the Associated Students of the University of Arizona (ASUA) and Arizona Athletics yet run by a team of individuals called the ZonaZoo Crew. In 2014, ESPN ranked ZonaZoo as the top student cheering section in the PAC 12 conference and in 2015, and in 2018, ZonaZoo received the Best Student Section of the Year award from the National Collegiate Student Section Association.

Notable venues
The McKale Center, which opened in 1973, is used by men's and women's basketball, women's gymnastics, and women's volleyball. The official capacity has changed often. The largest crowd to see a game in McKale was 15,176 in 1976 for a game against the University of New Mexico, the main rival during that period. In 2000, the floor in McKale was dubbed Lute Olson Court, for the basketball program's winningest coach. During a memorial service in 2001 for Lute's wife, Bobbi, who died from ovarian cancer, the floor was renamed Lute and Bobbi Olson Court. In addition to the playing surface, McKale Center is host to the offices of the UA athletic department. McKale Center is named after J.F. Pop McKale, who was athletic director and coach from 1914 through 1957. Joe Cavaleri ("The Ooh-Aah Man") made his dramatic and inspiring appearances there. Arizona Stadium, built in 1928 and last expanded in 2013, seats 56,037 patrons. It hosts American football games and has also been used for university graduations. The turf is bermuda grass, taken from the local Tucson National Golf Club. Arizona football's home record is 258–139–12. The largest crowd ever in Arizona Stadium was 59,920 in 1996 for a game against Arizona State University. Rita Hillenbrand Memorial Stadium hosts softball games. Jerry Kindall Field at Frank Sancet Stadium hosted baseball games until the 2012 season, when the baseball program began playing home games at Hi Corbett Field, a former Cactus League spring training facility three miles southeast of campus.

Student life

Fraternities and sororities
The University of Arizona recognizes 51 fraternity and sorority chapters. As of 2018, more than 16% of students are part of UA's 52-chapter Greek life program. Four governing councils govern fraternities and sororities. The Interfraternity Council (IFC) represents 20 fraternities, the National Pan-Hellenic Council (NPHC) represents 7 historically African-American fraternities and sororities, the Panhellenic Association (PHC) represents 20 sororities and the United Sorority and Fraternity Council (USFC) represents 21 multicultural and multi-interest Greek organizations. Delta Chi Lambda is an Asian American sorority established at the University of Arizona in 2000. The Lambda chapter of Phrateres, a non-exclusive, non-profit social-service club, was installed in 1937.

Marching band
The University of Arizona marching band, named The Pride of Arizona, played at the halftime of the first Super Bowl. Most recently, the Pride's 2014 Daft Punk show was chosen by the CBDNA (College Band Directors National Association) as one of ten in the nation to be presented at their National Conference in March 2015. They are directed by UA alumnus and former Pride of Arizona member Chad Shoopman.

Dormitories
Cochise Hall is a dormitory at the university, commissioned in 1921 and updated in 1992. While it started out as a male dorm, it is currently co-ed. Large Roman pillars adorn the front of the building. Fire escapes are highly visible from the courtyard of the edifice, and are frequently involved in practical jokes among residents. Cochise Hall is most famous for its inclusion in the 1984 blockbuster film Revenge of the Nerds. In the film, Cochise Hall was home to the freshmen, including the nerds, until the Alpha Beta house was burned down and the jocks kicked them out.

Notable alumni and staff

See also

 Arizona School liberalism
 Knowledge River
 Optics Valley
 Sustainability at The University of Arizona
 University of Arizona College of Optical Sciences
 University of Arizona Museum of Art
 University of Arizona Poetry Center
 USS Arizona salvaged artifacts

Notes

References

External links

 
 Arizona Athletics website
 
 

 
Educational institutions established in 1885
Land-grant universities and colleges
University of Arizona
University of Arizona
1885 establishments in Arizona Territory
Schools of mines in the United States
Institutes associated with CERN
School buildings completed in 1921
1921 establishments in Arizona
BSL3 laboratories in the United States
Universities and colleges accredited by the Higher Learning Commission